Oscar Marion was an American slave and militiaman during the Revolutionary War. He was the slave of Brigadier-General Francis Marion, the legendary "Swamp Fox." In December 2006, Oscar Marion was recognized as an "African American Patriot" in a ceremony at the U.S. Capitol, and a proclamation signed by President George W. Bush expressed the appreciation of a "grateful nation" for Oscar Marion's "devoted and selfless consecration to the service of our country in the Armed Forces of the United States." 

It is believed that, following custom, Oscar was made to take the last name of his owner, and he was one of roughly 200 slaves (many with the last name of Marion) who were kept in bondage by Francis Marion. But there may have been a close personal connection between the general and his slave. It is believed that Oscar Marion appears in at least one painting of the general. General Marion Inviting a British Officer to Share His Meal shows a Black man only a few feet from Marion, kneeling at a fire and roasting sweet potatoes as a British officer is invited to dine with the Americans. In the December 2006 ceremony, Bush and several congressmen recognized the image as representing Oscar Marion. 

The painting, by South Carolina artist John Blake White appeared on Confederate banknotes issued in South Carolina. It currently hangs in the third-floor corridor of the Senate Wing of the U.S. Capitol. Following his seven years of service with Gen. Marion in the Revolutionary War, Oscar Marion likely returned with the general to Francis Marion's large Berkeley County, South Carolina, plantation. There is no evidence that Oscar ever married or had children.

In the Walt Disney Studios  miniseries The Swamp Fox, Smoki Whitfield played Oscar Marion opposite Leslie Nielsen's Francis Marion. Whitfield sang the series' theme song, adding new verses in each of the eight installments to chronicle the characters' latest adventures

References

Year of birth missing
Year of death missing
18th-century American slaves
African Americans in the American Revolution
South Carolina militiamen in the American Revolution
Patriots in the American Revolution
South Carolina colonial people